Harry Martin Skreja (born 13 February 1953) is a former Australian rules footballer who played with Footscray in the Victorian Football League (VFL).

Skreja was captain / coach of the Wangaratta Football Club in 1975 and kicked 95 goals in the Ovens & Murray Football League.

Skreja was captain / coach of Leeton in 1979 and represented the South West Football League (New South Wales) also.

Notes

External links 

Living people
1953 births
Australian rules footballers from Victoria (Australia)
Western Bulldogs players